is a Japanese company headquartered in Tokyo, Japan, that offers computer hardware and electronics products.

Overview
Originally, in 1995, Princeton Technology Ltd. was established.
The company is basically fabless company, designing the products, ordering them to the manufactures in Taiwan and China etc.. The company offers flash memory products (SD cards, USB flash drives), DRAM, LCD, LED display, Hard disk drives, NAS and other electronics products. Princeton products are sold mostly in Japanese domestic market, but we can find several products at some online shopping, Amazon.com etc.. The business type and scope is same as Green House, Elecom and Buffalo, these are also the companies in Japan. In 2014, the company name was changed from Princeton Technology Ltd. to Princeton Ltd..

In the aspect of business-to-business, as the supplier of computer hardware, Princeton has contributed to offer the various flash memory and DRAM products to major electronics companies in Japan, such as Sony, Panasonic and Toshiba etc..

Princeton is also known that the company has been the official agency of Cisco, Polycom, Edgewater networks, Proware Technology and  Drobo etc., and has introduced several cloud collaboration systems and SAN systems in Japan. The company has presented IT solution for education systems by installing Cisco and Edgewater networks cloud collaboration products, and as another example, SAN systems by installing Princeton, Proware Technology and Drobo NAS products.

See also
 List of companies of Japan

References

External links
 Official Website

Computer companies established in 1995
Computer hardware companies
Computer memory companies
Computer peripheral companies
Computer storage companies
Electronics companies of Japan
Japanese brands
Japanese companies established in 1995